Prem Qaidi  (Prisoner of Love) is 1991 Indian Hindi-language musical film written by and directed by K. Murali Mohana Rao. The film stars Karisma Kapoor (in her debut), Harish Kumar, Paresh Rawal, Dalip Tahil, Asrani, Shafi Inamdar and Bharat Bhushan. The film was a remake of the 1990 Telugu film Prema Khaidi.

Background
The film was a remake of the 1990 Telugu film Prema Khaidi, by E. V. V. Satyanarayana, and marked the feature film debut of actress Karishma Kapoor, as the first female star from the Kapoor family allowed to enter the film industry. Karishma Kapoor was only 16 when acting in this film, which was how she made her debut, while her co star Harish Kumar was only 15.

Plot
In bad fortune, while saving his employer Kasturi Prasad's (Dalip Tahil) life, Suryanath (Bharat Bhushan) loses his legs. In appreciation, Kasturi allows Chandramohan (Harish Kumar), Suryanath's son, to work in his home. Kasturi's daughter Neelima (Karisma Kapoor) initially makes fun of and teases Chandra, but soon falls in love with him. Kasturi is against this affair and sends henchmen to attack Chandra, which results in their murdering Suryanath during the melee. Young Chandra is convicted of the crime and is sent to a youth detention center as a punishment. The head jailer tortures Chandra, but center Superintendent Prabhavati (Rama Vij) understands his emotions and love for Neelima and intercedes. She tries to reunite the two lovers.

Cast
 Harish as Chandramohan 
 Karishma Kapoor as Neelima
 Dalip Tahil as Kasturi Prasad 
 Paresh Rawal as Prabhavati's Husband
 Rama Vij as  Superintendent Prabhavati
 Bharat Bhushan as Suryanath 
 Shafi Inamdar as Jailor 
 Harish Patel as Kasturi's Henchman
 J. D. Chakravarthy as Prabhavati's Son
 Anjana Mumtaz as Neelima's Mother
 Asrani as Pandit
 Ali as Prisoner in Youth Detention Center
 Narsing Yadav as Driver
 Rajitha as Neelima's Friend

Soundtrack

References

External links 
 

1990s Hindi-language films
Indian romantic drama films
Films scored by Anand–Milind
Indian prison films
Films set in prison
Hindi remakes of Telugu films
1991 romantic drama films
1991 films
Suresh Productions films